Montana Colton Love (born January 7, 1995) is an American professional boxer who has held the IBF North American light welterweight title since 2022.

Professional career
Love made his professional debut against Willie Miller on April 11, 2015, scoring a third-round disqualification victory at the Stafford Center in Stafford, Texas.

After compiling a record of 11–0 (5 KOs), Love faced Kenneth Sims Jr. for the vacant WBC Youth Silver light welterweight title on July 20, 2018, at the WinnaVegas Casino & Resort in Sloan, Iowa. The bout ended in a split draw, with one judge scoring the bout 77–75 in favor of Love, another scoring it 77–75 in favor of Sims, while the third judge scored it even at 76–76.

Following four more wins, two by stoppage, Love faced former world champion Ivan Baranchyk as part of the undercard for Jake Paul vs. Tyron Woodley on August 29, 2021, at the Rocket Mortgage FieldHouse in Cleveland, Ohio. Love won the bout via seventh-round corner retirement (RTD).

After a third-round technical knockout (TKO) victory against Carlos Diaz in December 2021, Love faced Gabriel Gollaz as part of the undercard for Canelo Álvarez vs. Dmitry Bivol on May 7, 2022, at the T-Mobile Arena in Paradise, Nevada. Love won the bout via unanimous decision (UD) with all three judges scoring the contest 114–112.

On November 12, 2022, Love lost a fight by disqualification to Steve Spark in Cleveland. Love was dropped by Spark in the second round but recovered. In the sixth round, an inadvertent head butt opened a cut over Love's left eye, leading to a momentary stoppage. Shortly after the fight resumed, Love and Spark were caught in a clinch, and Love drove Spark to the ropes, where Spark was flipped over the top rope and out of the ring. Referee David Fields disqualified Love for shoving Spark, ending the fight. Subsequently, both Love and promoter Eddie Hearn objected to the referee's decision to disqualify Love, arguing that Love pushed Spark inadvertently and did not intend to push him out of the ring.

Professional boxing record

References

External links
 

1995 births
Living people
American male boxers
Boxers from Cleveland
Southpaw boxers
Light-welterweight boxers